The Wood Sky Pup is an American single-seat, high wing, cantilever, single engine, conventional landing gear ultralight aircraft that was designed by Stephen K. Wood of Whitewater, Colorado for amateur construction.

Design and development
Introduced in 1982, the Sky Pup is a single seater designed as an FAR 103 Ultralight Vehicles compliant aircraft with an empty weight within that category's  empty weight limit. The aircraft was intended to require the minimum financial investment and the designer intended that the airframe would be able to be completed for US$1000 using locally available materials. Cliche reported in 2001 that Sky Pups had been  completed for US$2000, including the engine.

The airframe is constructed from Douglas fir and styrofoam, all covered in Dacron or polyester fabric. The wing is a three-piece design, allowing quick disassembly for transport or storage. The landing gear suspension is made from maple wood. The Sky Pup can be built with an open cockpit or fully enclosed, allowing flying in cooler weather. The Sky Pup is available as plans only. The  2si 215,  Hirth F-33 and  Zenoah G-25 have also been used.

The design was professionally engineered and incorporates a very clean cantilever wing that results in a 12:1 glide ratio. The control system is two-axis, using only elevator and rudder controls, roll being introduced by rudder via a generous dihedral angle. The elevator is stick-controlled, while the rudder is controlled via conventional aircraft pedals. The aircraft is stall and spin proof. Reported construction times are 450–600 hours.

Plans were initially sold direct by the designer and, in the early 2000s, by the Vintage Ultra and Lightplane Association. Later the designer's son marketed the plans and this is the current source.

Specifications (Sky Pup)

See also

References

External links
Photo of a Sky Pup
 Construction of a Skypup

1980s United States ultralight aircraft
Single-engined tractor aircraft
High-wing aircraft
Aircraft first flown in 1980